Dirck Ten Broeck is the name of:

Dirck Wesselse Ten Broeck (1638–1717), was the Mayor of Albany, New York from 1696 to 1698.
Dirck Ten Broeck (mayor) (1686–1751), was the Mayor of Albany, New York from 1746 to 1748 (grandson of the above).
Dirck W. Ten Broeck (1738–1780), was a member of the New York State Senate from 1777 to 1779 (son of the above).
Dirck Ten Broeck (1765–1833), was Speaker of the New York State Assembly from 1798 to 1800 (son of Abraham Ten Broeck and nephew of the above).